Bad Griesbach im Rottal, or just Bad Griesbach, is a town in the district of Passau in Bavaria in Germany.

History

"Burg Griesbach" is first mentioned in a document from around 1076. The place was part of Landshut. It was raided and destroyed by an army from the Electorate of the Palatinate in 1504, only to be re-erected soon afterwards. In 1778/79 Griesbach was occupied by Austrian forces. As part of the Dukedom Bavaria,  (official name) became more independent. In 1953 it was officially turned into a town (Kleinstadt). 
The Bavarian reform of 1972 merged the municipalities of Karpfham, Parzham, Reutern, St. Salvator and Weng. The discovery of hot springs in 1972/73 lead to a new orientation as a spa town.

Mayors
The mayor is Jürgen Fundke, he was elected in 2008 with 58% of the votes and re-elected in 2014 and 2020. He is the successor of Robert Erdl (CSU). The predecessors were Konrad Ebner (CSU) and Edmund Mitzam.

Notable people 

 The Holy Conrad of Parzham (born Johann Birndorfer) was born on December 22, 1818 in the hamlet Parzham, (died 1894), since 1977 Konrad is the patron saint of Bad Griesbach
 Josef Altstötter (1892-1979), lawyer, secretary of state in the ministry of justice and war criminal, was born in Griesbach
 Franz Beckenbauer (born 1945), football player and manager, is, together with the bathroom pioneer Alois Hartl, since 2003 honorary citizen of Bad Griesbach.

International relations

Bad Griesbach (Rottal) is twinned with:
  Friesach, Austria

References

Passau (district)
Spa towns in Germany